Keystone Kapers is a platform game developed by Garry Kitchen for Activision and published for the Atari 2600 in April 1983. It was ported to the Atari 5200, Atari 8-bit family, ColecoVision, and in 1984, MSX. Inspired by Mack Sennett's slapstick Keystone Cops series of silent films, the object of the game is for Officer Keystone Kelly to catch Harry Hooligan before he can escape from a department store.

Gameplay

The game takes place in side-view of a three-story department store and its roof. The store is eight times wider than the screen; reaching the edge of the screen flips to the next section of the store. A mini-map at the bottom of the screen provides an overall view of the store and characters.

Officer Kelly begins the game in the lower right on the first floor. The joystick moves Kelly left and right. Vertical movement between floors is accomplished by escalators at the ends of the map and a central elevator.

Harry Hooligan starts the game in the center of the second floor. He immediately begins running to the right to reach the elevator to the third floor. Hooligan continues moving up the floor. If he succeeds, then he escapes. This trip takes 50 seconds, and a timer at the top of the screen counts down the remaining time. Kelly runs significantly faster than Hooligan and can normally catch him in that time in a straight run with no penalties.

Kelly can use the elevator to get ahead of Hooligan, causing Hooligan to reverse direction and start back down through the store. He can jump down between levels at either end of the map, something Kelly cannot do because the escalators only go up for Kelly. Kelly has to use the elevator carefully, or risk being stuck on a higher floor while the timer runs out.

Slowing Kelly's progress are obstacles like radios, beach balls, and shopping carts, which can be jumped over or ducked under by pushing up or down on the joystick. Hitting any of these objects causes a nine-second penalty. In later levels, flying toy biplanes cause the player to lose a life upon contact.

The player begins with three lives. One is lost if Hooligan remains uncaught when the timer runs out. Extra lives are awarded at every 10,000 points, up to the maximum of three. If Kelly catches Harry, points are awarded based on the remaining time. Kelly can pick up suitcases and bags of money for 50 points each. Each level gets progressively harder, adding more and/or faster hazards, until Kelly loses all of his lives.

Activision patch
Players who achieved a score of 35,000 or better could send a photo of the screen to Activision to receive a Billy Club patch.

Reception
The Atari 2600 version of Keystone Kapers received a Certificate of Merit in the category of "1984 Videogame of the Year (Less than 16K ROM)" at the 5th annual Arkie Awards. Deseret News gave the ColecoVision port 3 stars, praising the graphical improvement over the original.

In December 1984, Antic reviewer Ellen Keyt called out the quality of the animation in the Atari 8-bit version, writing "The Keystone Cop's legs stretch when he jumps over a shopping cart, his uniform creases when he squats to duck a toy airplane, and he even pumps his hands up and down, waving his stick when he runs." She called it the "perfect game for anyone".

Legacy
Dan Kitchen, Garry's brother, worked on an unfinished sequel for the Atari 2600 under the title Keystone Cannonball. He described it as "the Keystone cop on a train".

See also

List of Atari 2600 games
List of Activision games: 1980–1999

References

External links
 Keystone Kapers for the Atari 2600 at Atari Mania
 Keystone Kapers for the Atari 8-bit family at Atari Mania
 Keystone Kapers at AtariAge
 

1983 video games
Activision games
Atari 2600 games
Atari 5200 games
Atari 8-bit family games
ColecoVision games
MSX games
Platform games
Video games about police officers
Video games based on films
Video games designed by Garry Kitchen
Video games developed in the United States